Sophie Taillé-Polian (née Taillé; born 4 October 1974) is French politician who has represented Val-de-Marne's 11th constituency in the National Assembly since 2022. She previously served as a Senator for Val-de-Marne from 2017 to 2022.

See also 

 List of deputies of the 16th National Assembly of France

References 

Living people
1974 births
Deputies of the 16th National Assembly of the French Fifth Republic
21st-century French politicians
21st-century French women politicians
Women members of the National Assembly (France)
Members of Parliament for Val-de-Marne
Génération.s politicians
Paris Nanterre University alumni
French Senators of the Fifth Republic
Senators of Val-de-Marne